Uzovce is a village and municipality in Sabinov District in the Prešov Region' of north-eastern Slovakia.

History
In historical records the village was first mentioned in 1370.

Geography
The municipality lies at an altitude of 393 metres and covers an area of 5.542 km². It has a population of about 500 people.

External links
https://web.archive.org/web/20070513023228/http://www.statistics.sk/mosmis/eng/run.html

Villages and municipalities in Sabinov District